Ismaël Kip (born 6 May 1987 in Zwolle) is a Dutch professional racing cyclist.

Career wins
2004 
National Championship, Track, Pursuit, Juniors, The Netherlands, Alkmaar (NED)
2007 
ZLM Tour
2008 
UIV Cup Rotterdam, U23 (NED)

See also
Cycling in the Netherlands

References

External links

1987 births
Living people
Dutch male cyclists
Dutch track cyclists
Sportspeople from Zwolle
20th-century Dutch people
21st-century Dutch people
Cyclists from Overijssel